The 2019–20 Creighton Bluejays men's basketball team represented Creighton University in the 2019–20 NCAA Division I men's basketball season. The Bluejays were led by 10th-year head coach Greg McDermott and played their home games at the CHI Health Center Omaha in Omaha, Nebraska, as members of the Big East Conference. They finished the season 24–7, 13–5 in Big East play to earn share of the Big East regular season championship. The Big East tournament and all other postseason tournaments including the NCAA tournament were canceled shortly after the regular season ended due to the ongoing COVID-19 pandemic. The cancellations effectively ended the Bluejays' season.

Previous season
The Bluejays finished the 2018–19 season 20–15, 9–9 in Big East play to finish in a four-way tie for third place. As the No. 5 seed in the Big East tournament, they lost to Xavier in the quarterfinals. They received a bid to the National Invitation Tournament as the No. 2 seed in the TCU bracket where they defeated Loyola and Memphis before losing to TCU in the quarterfinals.

Offseason

2019 recruiting class

Roster

Schedule and results

|-
!colspan=9 style=|Australia exhibition trip

|-
!colspan=9 style=|Exhibition

|-
!colspan=9 style=|Non-conference regular season

|-
!colspan=9 style=|Big East regular season

|-
!colspan=9 style="|Big East tournament

Source

Rankings

*AP does not release post-NCAA Tournament rankings

References

2019–20 Big East Conference men's basketball season
2018-19
2020 in sports in Nebraska
2019 in sports in Nebraska